Kerry Porter (born September 23, 1964) is a former American football running back. He played for the Buffalo Bills in 1987, the Oakland Raiders in 1989 and for the Denver Broncos in 1990.

References

1964 births
Living people
American football running backs
Washington State Cougars football players
Buffalo Bills players
Oakland Raiders players
Denver Broncos players